Sebastian Zietz (born February 6, 1988 in Fort Pierce, Florida) is an American professional surfer. Zietz grew up in Kauai, Hawaii, after his parents moved there in 1988 and started surfing at 4 years old. In 2013, he qualified for the World Championship Tour for the first time, after winning the Reef Hawaiian Pro at Haleiwa, Hawaii.
In 2016, he won his first World Surf League event, the Drug Aware Margaret River Pro held in Margaret River, Western Australia.

References

External links

1988 births
Living people
People from Kauai
American surfers
World Surf League surfers